Cybathlon, a project of ETH Zurich, acts as a platform that challenges teams from all over the world to develop assistive technologies suitable for everyday use with and for people with disabilities. The driving force behind CYBATHLON is international competitions and events, in which teams consisting of technology developers from universities, companies or NGOs and a person with disabilities (pilot) tackle various everyday tasks with their latest assistive technologies. Besides the actual competition, the Cybathlon offers a platform to drive forward research on assistance systems for everyday use, and to promote dialogue with the public for the inclusion of people with disabilities in society.

The first Cybathlon organised by the Swiss Federal Institute of Technology in Zurich (ETH Zurich) took place in the Swiss Arena in Kloten north of Zurich in Switzerland on 8 October 2016 and was the first international competition of this kind. 66 pilots from 25 nations competed in front of a stadium with approximately 4600 spectators.

The 2020 Cybathlon took place on 13–14 November 2020. The ongoing COVID-19 pandemic necessitated that this “Global Edition” take place remotely, with teams setting up the infrastructure for the competition at their home bases and with the races, overseen by Cybathlon officials, taking place via video.

CYBATHLON 2024: ETH Zurich’s unique non-profit project continues! From 25 to 27 October 2024, the third edition of the CYBATHLON will take place in a global format in the Arena Schluefweg in Kloten near Zurich and in local hubs all around the world. 160 international teams from the worlds of academia and industry will compete in a unique competition.

Background
Robert Riener, head of the professorship for Sensory-Motor Systems at ETH Zurich, initiated the Cybathlon in 2013 as a platform for the development of everyday-suitable assistance systems.

The event organised under the umbrella of ETH Zurich is supported financially as well as ideologically by partners and through patronage.

Whereas other international competitions for disabled athletes, such as the Paralympics, only permit competitors to use unpowered assistive technology, the Cybathlon encourages the use of performance-enhancing technology such as powered exoskeletons. 

Teams can compete in eight different disciplines. A team always consists of a pilot (person with a disability that meets the inclusion criteria of the respective discipline) and a technology provider (university or company) who work closely together. Currently, the split is about 70% with a university and 30% with a company background (e.g. manufacturers of commercially available prostheses).

Disciplines 
The CYBATHLON competition is comprised with eight different disciplines. The tasks in the CYBATHLON disciplines are designed to reflect everyday activities that can be challenging for people with disabilities. While solving the respective tasks in competition, it is shown how well the developed technology is suited to support the pilot in everyday life.

Teams compete on courses designed to test how well suited a given technology is to helping its user with everyday tasks, for example climbing stairs or opening doors. In each discipline several pilots compete simultaneously. The tasks and rules are defined in detail for each of the six disciplines. Most important is that the pilots complete the tasks correct, safe and secure. Time comes in as a secondary factor.

 Brain-Computer Interface (BCI) Race: In the BCI race, pilots with quadriplegia use brain-computer interfaces to control avatars in a computer game. The aim of this technology is to control devices such as wheelchairs for people with limited ability to move.
 Functional Electrical Stimulation (FES) Bike Race: The FES race is for pilots with paraplegia. Functional electrical stimulation is enabling them to perform a pedalling movement on a recumbent bicycle.
 Arm Prosthesis Race: In this race, pilots using an arm prosthesis on one or both sides can compete. The prosthesis has to include the wrist and can be navigated with any kind of control.
 Leg Prosthesis Race: In this race, pilots using a leg prosthesis on one or both sides, including a knee joint, have to perform various movements. They can use any kind of active or passive prosthetic device.
 Exoskeleton Race: In this race, pilots with complete thoracic or lumbar spinal cord injury can compete using an exoskeleton. This wearable, powered support enables them to walk and master other everyday tasks.
 Wheelchair Race: In this race, pilots with severe walking disability using a powered wheelchair can compete. The wheelchairs feature novel technologies to overcome obstacles such as stairs or doors.
 Assistance Robot Race: The Race consists of tasks that contain elements of human-robot interaction. Both pilots and robots recognize and manipulate various objects, avoid obstacles and react to some dynamic elements on the track.
 Vision Assistance Race: The Race includes elements of spatial orientation and personal mobility, such as boarding and leaving a public bus and react to some dynamic elements. Tasks are tackled under a time constraint. Pilots are to recognize the context of a task and avoid obstacles.

Cybathlon 2016
Medals were awarded to both the pilots themselves and to the companies or institutions that create their bionics.

Competitions were organized in such a way that the participants could demonstrate not only their own skills, but also the distinctive qualities of assistive technologies. For example, in the category of "hand prostheses", competitors attempted several food-related fine motor tasks and in the category "Neuro" the participants managed avatars in a specially designed computer game.

The winners:
Brain-Computer Interface Race: Numa Poujouly - Team Brain Tweakers (Switzerland)
Functional Electrical Stimulation Bike Race: Mark Muhn - Team Cleveland (US)
Arm Prosthesis Race: Robert (Bob) Radocy - Team Dipo Power (Netherlands)
Exoskeleton Race: Andre Van Ruschen - Team ReWalk (Germany)
Leg Prosthesis Race: Helgi Sveinsson - Team Rheo Knee (Iceland)
Wheelchair Race: Florian Hauser - Team HSR Enhanced (Switzerland)

Cybathlon 2020 
Cybathlon 2020 took place on 13 – 14 November 2020 – globally and in a new format, at the teams’ home bases. They set up their infrastructure for the competition and filmed their races. Instead of starting directly next to each other, the pilots started individually and under the supervision of Cybathlon officials. From ETH Zurich, the competitions were broadcast through a new platform in a unique live programme. At the Cybathlon 2020 Global Edition, pilots and their technology development teams showed what they have achieved together over the past years and will offer the spectators an unforgettable competition experience.

The winners:
Brain-Computer Interface Race: Francesco Bettella – Team WHi (Italy)
Functional Electrical Stimulation Bike Race: Sander Koomen – Team PULSE Racing (Netherlands)
Arm Prosthesis Race: Andrej Đukić – Team Maker Hand (Croatia)
Exoskeleton Race: Kim Byeong-Uk – Team Angel Robotics 1 (South Korea)
Leg Prosthesis Race: Andre Frei – Team Circleg (Switzerland)
Wheelchair Race: Florian Hauser – Team Robility enhanced (Switzerland)

References

External links
 
YouTube channel
"Cybathlon 2016: first 'Olympics' for bionic athletes". Wired UK. 27 March 2014.

Assistive technology
Bionics